David Rolston Emmanuel Joseph (born 15 November 1969) is a former West Indian international cricketer who played all of his four Test matches against touring Australia in 1999. His only 50 came in his maiden test innings when he scored 50 and shared 88 runs partnership for the third wicket with Brian Lara to take the score to 2-116 before West Indies were collapsed to 167 at Queen's Park Oval, Port of Spain, Trinidad. In the second innings, West Indies were all out for a humiliating 51.

He also captained Antigua and Barbuda in the cricket tournament at the 1998 Commonwealth Games.

1969 births
Living people
West Indies Test cricketers
Leeward Islands cricketers
Antigua and Barbuda cricketers
Commonwealth Games competitors for Antigua and Barbuda
Cricketers at the 1998 Commonwealth Games